The Ibăneşti gas field is a natural gas field located in Ibăneşti, Mureș County. It was discovered in 1965 and developed by Romgaz. It began production in 1966 and produces natural gas and condensates. The total proven reserves of the Ibăneşti gas field are around 61 billion cubic feet (1.7 km³), and production is centered on 20 million cubic feet/day (0.57×105m³).

References

Natural gas fields in Romania
Geography of Mureș County